Mexico Village Historic District is a national historic district located at Mexico in Oswego County, New York.  The district includes 77 contributing buildings and three contributing structures.  There are 33 residential buildings, 23 commercial buildings, and 17 outbuildings.  It includes the central part of the built-up area of the small rural village of Mexico.  Beck's Hotel (1897) is the largest building in the district.

It was listed on the National Register of Historic Places in 1991.

References

Historic districts on the National Register of Historic Places in New York (state)
Historic districts in Oswego County, New York
National Register of Historic Places in Oswego County, New York